is an international company that supplies customers throughout the world with carbon fiber under the trade name Tenax.

History 
Toho Tenax has been a member of the Teijin Group since 2000.

Since May 2018, Toho Tenax was integrated to its subsidiary Teijin, and all of the group's subsidiaries were renamed after Teijin.

Description 
Toho Tenax has production units in Japan, the US and in Germany. The main products are carbon fiber, oxidized poly-acrylic-nitrile (PAN) fiber and advanced composite material.

See also
 Teijin
 Carbon fiber
 Twaron

References

External links
Official website

Chemical companies based in Tokyo
Textile companies of Japan
2007 mergers and acquisitions